A bogle is a ghost in Northumbrian and Scottish folklore. Bogle may also refer to:

 Bogle (surname)
 Bogle (dancer) (1964–2005), Jamaican dancer and choreographer
 Bogle (manga), a manga series written by Yuko Ichiju and illustrated by Shino Taira
 Bogle dance, a dance move originating in Jamaica
 Bogle Park, a softball stadium in Fayetteville, Arkansas
 Bogle Stroll, an annual sponsored walk in Manchester, England
 Bogle Vineyards, a California winery

See also
 Bogel, a municipality in Rhineland-Palatinate, Germany
 Bogles, a town in Carriacou, Grenada
 Boggle, a word game